Kitty King (born 10 August 1982) is a British Olympic eventing rider. She competed at the 2016 Summer Olympics in Rio de Janeiro where she finished 30th in the individual and 5th in the team competition.

King also participated at three European Eventing Championships (in 2005, 2015 and 2021). Her best results came at the 2015 Europeans held at Blair Castle, when she won a silver medal in the team competition and finished 4th individually. She was the highest placed of the Brits. King is the first British rider to win continental championship medals at all levels: Ponies, Juniors, Young Riders and now Seniors.

CCI5* Results

References

Living people
1982 births
British female equestrians
Equestrians at the 2016 Summer Olympics
Olympic equestrians of Great Britain